Erugosquilla septemdentata is a species of shrimp in the family, Squillidae, and was first described in 1994 by Shane T. Ahyong as Oratosquilla septemdentata. The name was revised to Erugosquilla septemdentata in 1995 by Raymond B. Manning.

It is a benthic, tropical species, and found at depths exceeding 400 m.

References

External links
Erugosquilla septemdentata occurrence data from GBIF

Taxa named by Shane T. Ahyong
Crustaceans described in 1994
Stomatopoda